The Battle of Loma de las Ánimas  took place on November 1, 1859 in the vicinity of Loma de las Animas in the state of Guanajuato, Mexico, between elements of the liberal army of the First Light Battalion, under the command of general Doubled Manuel and Santos Degollado and elements of the conservative army commanded by General Jose Maria Alfaro during the War of Reform. The battle ended as a Liberal victory.

References

History of Guanajuato
1859 in Mexico
Conflicts in 1859
Reform War